Antonia Papandreou-Suppappola from the Arizona State University, Tempe, AZ was named Fellow of the Institute of Electrical and Electronics Engineers (IEEE) in 2013 for contributions to applications of time-frequency signal processing.

References 

Fellow Members of the IEEE
Living people
Arizona State University faculty
University of Rhode Island alumni
21st-century American engineers
Year of birth missing (living people)
American electrical engineers